The Oleander-Rennen is a Group 2 flat horse race in Germany open to thoroughbreds aged four years or older. It is run over a distance of 3,200 metres (about 2 miles) at Hoppegarten in May.

History
The event is named after Oleander, a successful German racehorse in the 1920s. It was established in 1972, and the first two runnings were won by Sarto. For a period it held Listed status.

The Oleander-Rennen was promoted to Group 3 level in 1989. It was sponsored by the fashion company Betty Barclay from 1998 to 2009, and during this time it was known as the Betty Barclay-Rennen. It was raised to Group 2 level in 2017.

The race took place at Baden-Baden prior to 2012.

Records
Most successful horse (3 wins):
 Altano – 2012, 2013, 2014

Leading jockey (4 wins):
 Georg Bocskai – Prairie Snoopy (1978), Donat (1979, 1980), El Arco (1985)

Leading trainer (7 wins):
 Andreas Wöhler – Camp David (1996, 1997), Altano (2012, 2013, 2014), Wasir (2016), Red Cardinal (2017)

Winners

See also
 List of German flat horse races

References

 Racing Post / siegerlisten.com:
 1983, 1984, 1985, 1986, 1987, 

 galopp-sieger.de – Oleander-Rennen (ex Betty Barclay-Rennen).
 horseracingintfed.com – International Federation of Horseracing Authorities – Oleander-Rennen (2017).
 pedigreequery.com – Betty Barclay-Rennen (Oleander-Rennen) – Baden-Baden.

Open long distance horse races
Sport in Baden-Württemberg
Horse races in Germany
1972 establishments in West Germany
Recurring sporting events established in 1972